For information on all Saint Peter's College sports, see Saint Peter's Peacocks

The Saint Peter's Peacocks football team was the intercollegiate American football team of Saint Peter's College in Jersey City, New Jersey. The team competed in the NCAA Division I Football Championship Subdivision (FCS) and was in the Metro Atlantic Athletic Conference. The school's first football team was fielded in 1971. The football program was discontinued at the conclusion of the 2006 season.

References

 
1971 establishments in New Jersey
2006 disestablishments in New Jersey
American football teams established in 1971
American football teams disestablished in 2006